Callipallenidae is a family of Sea spider.

Genera
 Austropallene
 Bathypallenopsis
 Callipallene
 Oropallene
 Pallenopsis
 Parapallene
 Propallene
 Pseudopallene
 Stylopallene

See also
Propallene longiceps

References

Pycnogonids
Chelicerate families